Elmer Chickering (1857–1915) was a photographer specializing in portraits in Boston, Massachusetts, in the late 19th and early 20th centuries. He kept a studio on West Street, and photographed politicians, actors, athletes and other public figures such as Kyrle Bellew, John Philip Sousa, Sarah Winnemucca, Edmund Breese, and the Boston Americans.

Biography
Born in Vermont in 1857, Chickering moved to Boston and set up a photography studio around the 1880s.  His photographic work appeared in numerous publications, including Good Housekeeping. In 1905 Chickering renamed his business as "Elmer Chickering Co."

In 1895 Chickering "took some pictures of A. M. Palmer's company in the play of Trilby. They naturally came into great demand at once. But here the difficulty ensued. Rushing over the wires came a message from Harper & Bros., saying that, as the characters were made up after Du Maurier's drawings, they should regard the sale of any such pictures as an infringement of their copyright. To this Mr. Chickering disagreed, on the ground that the photographs were not copies of any drawings, but of actual scenes on the stage, which any man might sketch. Telegrams flew back and forth, but Harper & Bros, would not yield. Meanwhile, the papers sought for the photographs. ... Inasmuch as he has 160 negatives, the question is of some moment."

After Chickering's death in 1915, "the well-known Chickering Studios, West Street, Boston ... is now owned and operated by George H. Hastings and Orrin Champlain. ... Mr. Hastings, personally, manages the Chickering Studio, which is now enjoying a large and profitable patronage."

Examples of Chickering's work are in the New York Public Library.

References

Images

Further reading

Works with photos by Chickering
 
 . Photos of John L. Bates and his family.

Works about Chickering

External links

 WorldCat. Chickering, Elmer
 Google news archive. Articles about Chickering.
 NYPL. Works by Chickering
 NYPL. William Henry Crane as David Harum
 
  (includes info related to Chickering)

American portrait photographers
1857 births
1915 deaths
Photographers from Massachusetts
Artists from Boston
19th century in Boston
19th-century American photographers